The EuroHockey Championship III 2017 was the seventh edition of the EuroHockey Championship III, the third tier of the European field hockey championships. It was held from 30 July until 5 August 2017 in Sveti Ivan Zelina, Croatia. The tournament also allowed for promotion to the 2019 Men's EuroHockey Championship II, with the winner (Belarus) and runner-up (Italy) being promoted.

Qualified teams
The following seven teams, shown with pre-tournament world rankings, competed in the tournament.

Format
The seven teams were split into two groups of three and four teams. The top two teams advanced to the semi-finals to determine the winner in a knockout system. The bottom team from pool A and the bottom two teams from pool B played in a new group with the teams they did not play against in the group stage. Because of only sevens teams participating, no teams were relegated.

Results
All times are local (UTC+2).

Preliminary round

Pool A

Pool B

Fifth to seventh place classification

Pool C
The points obtained in the preliminary round against the other team are taken over.

First to fourth place classification

Semifinals

Third and fourth place

Final

Final standings

 Promoted to the EuroHockey Championship II

References

EuroHockey Championship III
Men 3
EuroHockey Championship III Men
International field hockey competitions hosted by Croatia
EuroHockey Championship III Men